Sweden has participated in all World Aquatics Championships since the beginning in 1973.

Medalists

Medal tables

By championships

By sport

By athlete

Only athletes with more than three medals

Nations at the World Aquatics Championships